The Zork Anthology is a video game compilation published in 1994 by Activision for the PC. A version compatible with modern computers was published in 2011 by digital distribution platform GOG.

Contents
The Zork Anthology contains the following games:
 Zork I Zork II Zork III Beyond Zork Zork Zero Planetfall (bonus game)

 Reception Next Generation reviewed the compilation, rating it three stars out of five, and stated that "Zork Anthology'' is an enchantingly nostalgic as well as a welcome return to the past".

References

1994 video games
Activision video game compilations
Classic Mac OS games
DOS games
Video games developed in the United States
Windows games
Zork